Lieutenant General Sir Christopher Francis Drewry,  is a retired senior officer of the British Army who served as commander of the Allied Rapid Reaction Corps from 2000 to 2002.

Military career
Drewry was commissioned into the Welsh Guards in 1969. He was mentioned in despatches during a tour in Northern Ireland in 1987, and appointed a Commander of the Order of the British Empire in the 1990 Birthday Honours.

In 1996 Drewry was appointed General Officer Commanding UK Support Command (Germany) and in 1997 he moved on to be Assistant Chief of Defence Staff for Policy at the Ministry of Defence. He was knighted as a Knight Commander of the Order of the Bath in the 2000 Birthday Honours, and appointed commander of the Allied Rapid Reaction Corps later that year. He retired in 2003.

References

|-
 

British Army lieutenant generals
Knights Commander of the Order of the Bath
Commanders of the Order of the British Empire
Living people
British military personnel of The Troubles (Northern Ireland)
Welsh Guards officers
Year of birth missing (living people)